Nothomastix is a genus of moths of the family Crambidae described by Warren in 1890.

Species
Nothomastix chromalis (Walker, 1866)
Nothomastix klossi (Rothschild, 1915)
Nothomastix obliquifascialis Hampson, 1896
Nothomastix pronaxalis (Walker, 1859)
Nothomastix pyranthes (Meyrick, 1894)

References

Spilomelinae
Crambidae genera
Taxa named by William Warren (entomologist)